The 2008 WNBA season was the 12th season of the Women's National Basketball Association. It was the first WNBA season with a franchise in Atlanta as the Dream were announced in late 2007.

No WNBA All-Star Game was held due to the 2008 Summer Olympics in Beijing, China. The regular season began with a televised (ABC) meeting between the defending champion Phoenix Mercury and the Los Angeles Sparks in Phoenix, Arizona, on May 17.

2007–2008 off-season
 On September 27, 2007, Phoenix Mercury coach Paul Westhead resigned and took a job as an assistant coach under P. J. Carlesimo for the Seattle SuperSonics. Assistant coach Corey Gaines was named the team's new head coach on November 7.
 On October 2, 2007, the Washington Mystics announced that Tree Rollins would be named the permanent head coach. Rollins had been the interim head coach since the resignation of Richie Adubato on June 1.
 On October 18, 2007, the WNBA announced the league awarded an expansion franchise to the city of Atlanta, Georgia, bringing the league to fourteen teams to start the 2008 season. The team hired Marynell Meadors as their head coach and general manager on November 27. The team name, the Atlanta Dream, was unveiled on January 23, 2008, with the expansion draft held on February 6.
 On October 26, 2007, The Indiana Fever declined to pick up the option for head coach Brian Winters. Lin Dunn was named the team's new coach on December 12.
 On November 30, 2007, the Seattle Storm announced the resignation of head coach Anne Donovan. Her replacement, Brian Agler, was named on January 9, 2008.

Atlanta Dream expansion draft
Atlanta held their expansion draft on February 6, 2008, when they selected one player from each of the thirteen teams in the league.

Some of the players chosen were:
 Érika de Souza
 Ann Wauters
 Betty Lennox

The Dream were then free to make trades with other teams in the league.

Draft
On October 23, 2007, the WNBA draft lottery was held. The Los Angeles Sparks received the first pick. The Chicago Sky was awarded the number two pick, followed by the Minnesota Lynx at number three, the Atlanta Dream at number four, the Houston Comets at number five and the Washington Mystics at number six.

The 2008 WNBA draft was held on April 9 in Tampa, Florida. Coverage of the first round was shown on ESPN2. Second and third round coverage was shown on NBA TV.

The top draft picks were as follows:
 Candace Parker, Los Angeles Sparks
 Sylvia Fowles, Chicago Sky
 Candice Wiggins, Minnesota Lynx
 Alexis Hornbuckle, Detroit Shock
 Matee Ajavon, Houston Comets
 Crystal Langhorne, Washington Mystics

Regular season

Standings

All-star game
There was no WNBA All-Star Game due to the break July 28 through August 27 for the 2008 Beijing Olympics. This marks the first time since the game was started in the 1999 season that there was no All-Star contest.

Statistic leaders

Playoffs and Finals

This was the outlook for the 2008 WNBA playoffs. Teams in italics had home court advantage. Teams in bold advanced to the next round.  Numbers to the left of each team indicate the team's original playoffs seeding in their respective conferences.  Numbers to the right of each team indicate the number of games the team won in that round.

2008 WNBA season summary

Season highlights
 Candace Parker becomes the second and third player in WNBA history to dunk in a regular season game.
 A fight breaks out between the Los Angeles Sparks and the Detroit Shock resulting in four ejections and ten suspensions.
 The first-ever outdoor professional basketball game is held at Arthur Ashe Stadium between the New York Liberty and the Indiana Fever. Over 19,000 fans attended the game.
 50-year-old hall-of-famer Nancy Lieberman signs a contract with the Detroit Shock to play in one game. She played 9 minutes and had 2 assists.
 The expansion Atlanta Dream set a record for the longest losing streak in WNBA history with 17 losses to give them an 0–17 start to the season.
 One of the original franchises, the Houston Comets, is put up for sale with an uncertain future.
 For the first time in WNBA history, the defending champion (Phoenix Mercury) does not qualify for the playoffs.
 Former Washington Mystics head coach Tree Rollins is relieved of his duties halfway through the season. Assistant coach Jessie Kenlaw is named interim head coach for the remainder of the season.
 The Detroit Shock sweep the San Antonio Silver Stars three-games-to-none in the Finals for the first time (in a best-of-five format).
 Candace Parker wins the WNBA Rookie of the Year Award and the MVP Award. This is the first time in WNBA history and the third time in professional basketball history for the two awards to be won in the same year by the same player.

End-of-season business report
 Regular-season attendance saw an increase of 2.21%.
 There were 46 sellouts, more than triple the 17 for the 2007 regular season and double the previous record of 23 in 2004.
 The WNBA on national television (ABC and ESPN2) finished up 19% both in ratings (0.32 vs 0.27) and viewership (413,000 vs. 346,000).
 The WNBA finished up in key demographics on ESPN2—Women 18–34 (up 71%) and Men 18–34 (up 28%) – and on ABC—All Women (up 10%) and Women 18–34 (up 20%).
 WNBA.com set all-time highs in visits and page views. Overall, WNBA.com received nearly 13 million visits and 59 million page views, up 35% and 20%, respectively.
 WNBA.com set monthly traffic records in July with more than 3.8 million visits and 16 million page views.
 On June 23, 2008, one day after Los Angeles Sparks rookie Candace Parker became the second WNBA player to dunk in a regular season game, WNBA.com set a single-day record with nearly 95,000 video streams.
 League merchandise sales were up more than 36%, and WNBA jersey sales were up more than 46%.

Season award winners

Coaches

Eastern Conference
Atlanta Dream: Marynell Meadors
Chicago Sky: Steven Key
Connecticut Sun: Mike Thibault
Detroit Shock: Bill Laimbeer
Indiana Fever: Lin Dunn
New York Liberty: Pat Coyle
Washington Mystics: Tree Rollins and Jessie Kenlaw

Western Conference
Houston Comets: Karleen Thompson
Los Angeles Sparks: Michael Cooper
Minnesota Lynx: Don Zierden
Phoenix Mercury: Corey Gaines
Sacramento Monarchs: Jenny Boucek
San Antonio Silver Stars: Dan Hughes
Seattle Storm: Brian Agler

See also
 WNBA
 WNBA draft
 WNBA All-Star Game
 WNBA Playoffs
 WNBA Finals

References

External links
 WNBA Official Website

 2008 WNBA Draft Lottery Results
 Atlanta names Marynell Meadors Head Coach/General Manager
 Seattle announces Brian Agler as Head Coach
 Atlanta's Expansion draft results/analysis

 
2008 in American women's basketball
2008–09 in American basketball by league
2007–08 in American basketball by league
Women's National Basketball Association seasons